Massacra was one of France's leading death/thrash metal bands in the early nineties.

After recording three demos in the 1980s, they finally landed a deal with Shark Records from Germany, and released their famous debut, Final Holocaust in 1990. Unfortunately, they found themselves at odds with the label's trend-following attitude and after two successful albums, Enjoy the Violence and Signs of the Decline, they terminated their contract in 1993.

They signed a new deal with the major label Phonogram. The band decided not to rehash the same songs over and over on later releases—by the time of their fourth album (1994's Sick) the band had transformed to groove-laden mid-paced thrash metal.

The band broke up after guitarist Fred Duval died of skin cancer on 6 June 1997 at the age of 29. Some members of the band went on to form an industrial side project called Zero Tolerance in 1996, and released one album through Active Records.

Discography 
 Legion of Torture (demo, 1987)
 Final Holocaust (demo, 1988)
 Nearer from Death (demo, 1989)
 Final Holocaust (1990)
 Enjoy the Violence (1991)
 Signs of the Decline (1992)
 Sick (1994)
 Humanize Human (1995)
 Apocalyptic Warriors, Pt. 1 (compilation, 2000)

Members

Last lineup 
Jean-Marc Tristani – guitar (1986–1997)
Fred "Death" Duval – vocals, guitar (1986–1997)
Pascal Jorgensen – vocals, bass (1986–1997)
Björn Crugger – drums (1995–1997)

Former members 
Chris Palengat – drums (1988–1991)
Matthias Limmer – drums (1992–1994)

French death metal musical groups
French thrash metal musical groups
Alternative metal musical groups
Musical quartets
Musical groups established in 1986
Musical groups disestablished in 1997
1986 establishments in France